The 1986 NBL Finals was the championship series of the 1986 season of Australia's National Basketball League (NBL) and the conclusion of the season's playoffs. The Adelaide 36ers defeated the Brisbane Bullets in three games (2-1) for the first NBL championship.

Format

The 1986 National Basketball League Finals was played in October 1986 between the top six teams of the regular season, consisting of knockout Quarter and Semi-finals followed by the league's first ever three-game Grand Final series.
.

Qualification

Qualified teams

The Ken Cole coached Adelaide 36ers had stormed through the regular season with a 24–2 record, including a 13–0 record on their home court at the Apollo Stadium, to finish 5 games clear of the Canberra Cannons and 7 clear of the defending champion Brisbane Bullets. They were also the only team in the league to score over 3,000 points during the season (3,016) and went into the Finals on a 12-game winning streak. The 36ers only losses for the regular season had come away from home on last second buzzer beaters from the West Sydney Westars and Coburg Giants respectively.

Ladder
This is the ladder at the end of season, before the finals. The top 6 teams qualified for the finals series.

The NBL tie-breaker system as outlined in the NBL Rules and Regulations states that in the case of an identical win–loss record, the results in games played between the teams will determine order of seeding.

Quarter-finals

(3) Brisbane Bullets vs (6) Sydney Supersonics

(4) West Sydney Westars vs (5) Illawarra Hawks

Semi-finals

(2) Canberra Cannons vs (3) Brisbane Bullets

(1) Adelaide 36ers vs (5) Illawarra Hawks

Grand Final series
After the Grand Final had been the traditional single game since the league began in 1979, the NBL introduced a three-game Grand Final series for 1986. They were rewarded when not only did the series go for all three games, but in Game 1 at the Brisbane Entertainment Centre a then Australian indoor sports attendance record of 11,000 saw the game go into overtime.

Teams

Adelaide 36ers (1)
 Head coach: Ken Cole
 Assistant coach: Don Shipway

Brisbane Bullets (3)
 Head coach: Brian Kerle

(1) Adelaide 36ers vs (3) Brisbane Bullets

Game 1

Adelaide led early, but a series of silly turnovers saw the Bullets take a 26–24 lead at the end of the first. Leroy Loggins then struck foul trouble in the second and led by their 'Twin Towers' Mark Davis and Bill Jones, Adelaide raced out to a 52–41 half time lead. With Loggins back in the third hitting his first 6 shots, Brisbane outscored the 36ers 32–24 and the lead was cut to just 3 points. The teams went toe to toe in the last but the turning point was Bill Jones stepping in front of Loggins who was called for the charge and was out of the game with 5 fouls. However, the score was locked at 111–111 at the end of time and the game was in overtime. Cooler heads prevailed for the series favourites and after Ray Wood stole an inbound pass that killed the Bullets chances, Adelaide won 122–119. For Adelaide, Davis scored 38 points and pulled in 23 rebounds while Loggins scored 38 for the Bullets.

Game 2

Game 2 in Adelaide was expected to see the 36ers, who had gone 14–0 at home to that point of the season, warp up their first NBL title. However, the defending champions, led by 38 points from Cal Bruton, would not go quietly. An early elbow injury to Mark Davis limited his effectiveness in the game and it was left to Darryl Pearce to keep the Adelaide scoreboard ticking over. Pearce scored 29 for Adelaide including hitting six 3-pointers during the second period. However it wasn't enough as Brian Kearle's Bullets stunned the 3,000 in attendance and won the game 104–83 to not only tie the series, but to end Adelaide's 20 game winning streak at home dating back to June 1985.

Game 3

Game 3 at the Apollo Stadium was a back and forth affair. The 36ers jumped out early and led 35–25 at the end of the first, while Brisbane hit back in the second and, coming from 16 points down to actually lead at one point, and were only down by 2 at the half. The third period saw Leroy Loggins, frustrated by the close, physical defence of Peter Ali, Dwayne Nelson and Mike McKay, foul out for the second time in the series. Despite 31 points from Cal Bruton, 22 from Ron Radliff and 14 rebounds from captain Larry Sengstock, Adelaide, led by Pearce with 27 points, Davis and Al Green with 22 points, and Davis and Jones with 25 and 13 rebounds respectively, had all the answers in the last to run away with the game 113–91 to win their first NBL Championship.

36ers Power forward Mark Davis, who averaged 24.3 points, 19.3 rebounds and 1.6 assists over the 3 games was named the Most Valuable Player for the Grand Final series.

See also
 1986 NBL season

References

Finals
National Basketball League (Australia) Finals